Senior Colonel Tang Hongbo (born October 1975) is a Chinese fighter pilot and People's Liberation Army Astronaut Corps (PLAAC) taikonaut. He flew on his first spaceflight to the Tiangong space station as a part of the Shenzhou 12 mission.

Biography 
He was born into a family of farming background in the town of Yunhuqiao, Xiangtan County, Hunan in October 1975. He has a younger brother.

Awarded the rank Senior Colonel, he joined the PLA Air Force in September 1995. Where he was promoted to the post of group commander at a fighter jet regiment. He was selected for the second group of astronauts at Nie's division in May 2010 then was chosen in May 2016 as an alternate for the two-member crew of the Shenzhou 11 mission.

A pilot in the People's Liberation Army Air Force, he was selected into the People's Liberation Army Astronaut Corps in 2010. He was part of the backup crew for Shenzhou 11, and flew as one of three crew members on Shenzhou 12, the first manned mission to the Tiangong space station.

On 4 July 2021, Tang and Liu Boming, another crew member of Shenzhou 12, completed the first extravehicular activity of Tiangong space station.

See also 

 List of Chinese astronauts
 Tiangong space station

References

External links 
 

People from Xiangtan County
Shenzhou program astronauts
People's Liberation Army Astronaut Corps
Living people
People's Liberation Army Air Force personnel
PLA Air Force Aviation University alumni
Spacewalkers
1975 births